Anna Ulrika Maria Åkerberg Palm (born 4 July 1941 in Enköping) is a Swedish curler. Also known as Ulrika Åkerberg-Palm.

In 1983 she was inducted into the Swedish Curling Hall of Fame.

Teams

Women's

Mixed

References

External links
 

Living people
1941 births
People from Enköping
Swedish female curlers
Swedish curling champions